North Platte High School may refer to:

North Platte High School (Missouri), Dearborn, Missouri, US
North Platte High School (Nebraska), North Platte, Nebraska, US